The Clock Tower of Ulcinj (Montenegrin: Sahat kula, Сахат кула, Turkish: Saat Kulesi), was built in Ulcinj, Montenegro in 1754 during the Ottoman Empire rule over the city, with the help of donations made by the citizens of Ulcinj. The name comes from the Turkish Saat Kulesi which literally means "Clock Tower" in English.

Purposes
The main purposes of the tower were calling people to their jobs, reminding them of their duties and making them aware of the time. Its location was carefully chosen, as it can be seen or its clock heard from every part of the town. It has a rectangular base, and it was made of a nicely irregular cut stone. The Sahat Kulla is located near the Namazgjahu Mosque and Kryepazari Mosque.
For a long time there used to be a man in Ulcinj whose title was muvekit (Ottoman Turkish for "timekeeper"), and his duty was to take care of the correctness of the clock on the Tower.

References 

Ulcinj
Ulcinj
Tourism in Montenegro
Clock towers in Montenegro